Georgiy Sheiko (born 24 August 1989 in Oral) is a Kazakhstani racewalker. He competed in the 20 km walk at the 2012 Summer Olympics, where he placed 35th.

In 2019, he competed in the men's 20 kilometres walk at the 2019 World Athletics Championships held in Doha, Qatar. He finished in 19th place.

References

1989 births
Living people
Kazakhstani male racewalkers
Olympic athletes of Kazakhstan
Athletes (track and field) at the 2012 Summer Olympics
Athletes (track and field) at the 2016 Summer Olympics
Athletes (track and field) at the 2020 Summer Olympics
People from Oral, Kazakhstan
Athletes (track and field) at the 2014 Asian Games
Athletes (track and field) at the 2018 Asian Games
World Athletics Championships athletes for Kazakhstan
Asian Games competitors for Kazakhstan